The Bingsheng Cup is an international women's Go tournament. It was created in 2010 and is held annually. The tournament is held at Qionglong Mountain in Suzhou, Jiangsu, China. It is also known as the Qionglong Mountain Bingsheng Cup. The name bingsheng is in honor of Sun Tzu, who is said to have written The Art of War at Qionglong Mountain; the historicity of Sun Tzu is uncertain.

Rules
The Bingsheng Cup is a Go competition for female players from China, Japan, South Korea, Taiwan, Europe, North America, and Oceania. It is a 16-player knockout tournament. Games are played under Chinese rules with a 7.5 point komi. Each player has 2 hours of main time with five 60-second byoyomi periods.

The winner's prize is 300,000 RMB and the runner-up's prize is 100,000 RMB (as of the 10th cup). Formerly, from the 1st to the 3rd Bingsheng Cup, the winner received 200,000 RMB in prize money and the runner-up received 80,000 RMB. From the 4th to the 6th cup, the prizes were 250,000 RMB and 100,000 RMB, respectively. In the 7th cup, the winner's prize was further increased to the current 300,000 RMB.

History
The Bingsheng Cup was first held in 2010. At the time of its creation, the Bingsheng Cup was the only international women's individual Go tournament. Other such tournaments had been held before, such as the Bohai Cup, but were discontinued or were one-off events. It remained the only one until the Wu Qingyuan Cup was established in 2018.

The 1st Bingsheng Cup winner was Park Jieun, and the runner-up was Joanne Missingham. Missingham, who was born in Australia and is a Taiwan Qiyuan professional player, represented Oceania in the tournament, achieving the best-ever international tournament result for a player born outside Asia.

Korean players have won the title 7 times and Chinese players have won 3 times. Japan's best result was a semifinals appearance by Rina Fujisawa in 2019.

Winners and runners-up

References

External links
 Nihon Ki-in archive (in Japanese)
 https://gotoeveryone.k2ss.info/news/wr/ql/ – game records

International Go competitions